Southern Illinois Airport  is a public airport in Jackson County, Illinois, United States. It is located three nautical miles (6 km) northwest of the central business district of Carbondale and east of Murphysboro. This airport is included in the FAA's National Plan of Integrated Airport Systems for 2015–2019, which categorized it as a general aviation facility.

The airport opened in 1950 and was originally known as Murdale Airport. Today it ranks as the eighth-busiest airport in the state.

The airport is owned and operated by Southern Illinois Airport Authority, a local governmental entity created under state law. A five-member board sets policy for the airport authority, and daily administration of the airport is carried out by an airport manager and staff. The board members are appointed by the mayors of Carbondale and Murphysboro and the Chairman of the Jackson County Board and serve for five years on a staggered basis.

Facilities and Aircraft 
Three lighted, hard surface runways provide all-weather capability. A precision instrument approach is available on the airport's primary runway.

For the 12-month period ending January 31, 2020, the airport had nearly 100,000 aircraft operations, an average of 273 per day: 75% general aviation, 25% air taxi, <1% military, and <1% commercial. At that time, there were 86 aircraft based at this airport: 78 single-engine and 7 multi-engine airplanes and 1 helicopter. In 2011, the airport had 70,000 operations, and there were 87 aircraft based at this airport.

The airport has a fixed-base operator (FBO) offering fuel and ground handling as well as hangars and parking. Flight training and aircraft maintenance and modifications are offered, as are pilot supplies, a courtesy car, and a restaurant.

The airport is capable of accommodating a variety of aircraft up to and including the Boeing 757. Sufficient aircraft ramps and tie-down spaces exist for a large and varied number of aircraft. Hangar space is available for based and transient aircraft up to and including the Gulfstream V.

Southern Illinois Airport is also the home operating base for Southern Illinois University's aviation flight and aviation technologies programs. A $63.3 million Transportation Education Center opened in fall 2012 on the south side of the airport. This edifice houses the Aviation Flight, Aviation Management, and Automotive Technologies programs under one roof. The TEC also houses flight and air traffic control simulator labs, classroom space, and vehicle storage/maintenance labs for automotive students. Nearby, an aviation test cell facility provides space for Aviation Technologies students to test piston- and turbine-powered aircraft engines.

An air traffic control tower operates daily from 7am to 9pm, and an ASOS weather facility operates on a 24-hour basis.

Economic Impact 
Southern Illinois Airport makes a substantial contribution to the local economy.

Based upon a study commissioned by the Illinois Aeronautics Division, the airport contributes more than $13.8 million in direct and indirect benefits to the region on an annual basis. Today the airport employs more than 175 full and part-time employees with an annual payroll exceeding $3.3 million. Yearly expenditures in the local area by the airport and seven businesses located here are more than $2.5 million. The authors used a conservative multiplier of 1.7 to result in a total annual impact exceeding $13.8 million.

Accidents & Incidents
On October 13, 1983, Air Illinois Flight 710 crashed while en route to Southern Illinois Airport. The plane was attempting to fly through a thunderstorm when it impacted the top of a ridge. The seven passengers and three crew on board were killed.
On August 21, 2001, a Hoskins Quickie Q2 crashed during landing at Southern Illinois Airport. The airplane veered off the right side of the runway, and the left canard and landing gear broke. A postaccident investigation revealed the fiberglass tail-wheel spring had fractured just forward of the tailwheel swivel assembly. The pilot and passenger on board were uninjured.
On February 12, 2022, a Cessna 172 crashed while attempting to land at the Southern Illinois Airport. The plane impacted power lines on final short of the runway, impacting terrain soon after. The sole pilot on board, a student at Southern Illinois University, was taken to the hospital to be treated for non-life-threatening injuries.

References

External links 
 Southern Illinois Airport, official website
 Aviation at Southern Illinois University Carbondale
 Aerial image as of 6 April 1998 from USGS The National Map
 
 

Airports in Illinois
Transportation buildings and structures in Jackson County, Illinois